This is the complete list of Asian Winter Games medalists in bandy from 2011.

Men

References

External links
2011 Asian Winter Games Official Website

Bandy
medalists